Madison Olsen  (born April 7, 1995) is an American freestyle skier who competes internationally. She was raised in Park City, Utah.
 
She participated at the 2018 Winter Olympics.

References

1995 births
Living people
American female freestyle skiers
Olympic freestyle skiers of the United States
Freestyle skiers at the 2018 Winter Olympics
21st-century American women